The following is an incomplete list of celebrities whose caricatures appear on the celebrity wall at Sardi's restaurant in New York City. All have eaten at Sardi's.

The date or year each caricature was added to Sardi's is often mentioned in brackets after the celebrities' name. Also mentioned is either the production the actor was in at the time of the unveiling or the play that included their definitive role; producers' companies are listed instead. Finally, some of the caricatures listed also include the cartoonist's name: Alex Gard, John Mackey, Donald Bevan, and Richard Baratz are the four artists to date who have created all the caricatures in the restaurant.

In 1979, Vincent Sardi, Jr., donated a collection of 227 caricatures from the restaurant to the Billy Rose Theatre Collection of the New York Public Library for the Performing Arts. The contributed caricatures date from the late 1920s through 1952.

A 
 George Abbott by Alex Gard
 George Abbott by Don Bevan
 F. Murray Abraham
 Yvonne Adair
 Cindy Adams
 Edie Adams
 Joey Adams
 Bruce Adler
 Stella Adler
 Danny Aiello by Richard Baratz
 Clay Aiken (Spamalot, December 23, 2008, Signed, "Finally I'm first at something!! Clay Aiken")
 Russell Barnett Aitken by Alex Gard
 Maria Alberghetti
 Eddie Albert by Richard Baratz
 Eddie Albert by John Mackey
 Alan Alda (Signed, "Hey, maybe now I'll get a table. Affectionately, Alan Alda")
 Jane Alexander
 Jason Alexander
 Richard Alexander
 Debbie Allen
 Jonelle Allen (Two Gentleman of Verona, 1972)
 Kelcey Allen by Alex Gard
 Steve Allen by Don Bevan
 Michael Allinson
 Winthrop Ames by Alex Gard
 Christine Andreas
 John Hargis Anderson by Alex Gard
 Dame Judith Anderson by Alex Gard
 Dana Andrews by Don Bevan
 Edward Andrews
 Philip Anglim
 Susan Anton
 Yvonne Arnaud by Alex Gard
 Lucie Arnaz
 Bobbe Arnst by Alex Gard
 Bea Arthur
 Jeff Ash
 Paul Ash by Alex Gard
 Annaleigh Ashford (Kinky Boots, December 11, 2013)
 Elizabeth Ashley
 Brooks Ashmanskas
 Ed Asner (Grace, October 9, 2012)
 Fred Astaire
 Dame Eileen Atkins
 Brooks Atkinson
 Sir Richard Attenborough
 Edith Atwater by Alex Gard 
 Hank Azaria (Spamalot, May 17, 2005)

B 
 Lauren Bacall
 Kevin Bacon by Richard Baratz
 Pearl Bailey by Don Bevan
 Phil Baker by Alex Gard
 Dylan Baker
 Mark-Linn Baker
 Nikita Balieff by Alex Gard
 Kate Baldwin (Big Fish, December 20, 2013)
 Lucille Ball
 Kaye Ballard by Don Bevan
 Anne Bancroft
 Antonio Banderas
 Tallulah Bankhead by Alex Gard
 Sara Bareilles
 Ellen Barkin
 Samantha Barks
 Clive Barnes by Richard Baratz
 Irina Baronova by Alex Gard
 Richard Barr
 Barbara Barrie
 Gene Barry by Richard Baratz
 Ethel Barrymore by Alex Gard
 Steve Barton
 Steven Baruch (producer Frankel-Baruch-Viertel-Routh Group, June 2004)
 Angela Bassett
 Bryan Batt (Saturday Night Fever, January 20, 2000)
 Hinton Battle
 Warner Baxter by Alex Gard
 Gary Beach
 Mayor Abe Beame
 Orson Bean
 Louise Beck
 Martin Beck
 Clyde Beatty by Alex Gard
 Harry Belafonte
 Barbara Bel Geddes
 Marty Bell
 Doris Belack
 Jim Belushi
 Laura Benanti (Gypsy, June 3, 2008)
 Robert Benchley by Alex Gard
 Constance Bennett by Alex Gard
 Joan Bennett
 Michael Bennett
 Melissa Benoist (Beautiful: The Carole King Musical, July 31, 2018)
 Jodi Benson by Richard Baratz
 Mimi Benzell
 Gertrude Berg
 Polly Bergen
 Ingrid Bergman by Don Bevan
 Leonard Bernstein by Don Bevan
 Milton Berle
 Irving Berlin
 Roger Berlind
 Herschel Bernardi
 Danny Burstein
 Jed Bernstein
 Leonard Bernstein
 Craig Bierko (The Music Man, August 4, 2000)
 Jason Biggs
 James "Jack" Binger
 Patricia Birch
 Philip Birsh
 David Birney
 Reed Birney (The Humans, June 2, 2016)
 Andre Bishop
 Sidney Blackmer
 Steve Blanchard
 Cate Blanchett (The Present, March 14, 2017)
 Stephanie J. Block (The Pirate Queen, June 14, 2007)
 Claire Bloom by Don Bevan
 Kermit Bloomgarden
 Betty Blythe by Alex Gard
 William Boehnel by Alex Gard
 Humphrey Bogart
 Richard Boleslawski by Alex Gard
 Ray Bolger
 Bill Boll
 Joseph Bologna
 Fortunio Bonanova by Alex Gard
 Lillian Booth
 Shirley Booth
 Olive Borden by Alex Gard
 Victor Borge by Richard Baratz
 Christian Borle (Something Rotten, August 21, 2015)
 Tom Bosley
 Barry Bostwick
 Patricia Bowman by Alex Gard
 Bob Boyar
 Eddie Bracken
 Mark Bramble
 James Brennan
 Mary Brian
 Fanny Brice by Alex Gard
 Lloyd Bridges
 Alex Brightman (School of Rock, June 9, 2016)
 Jim Brochu
 Matthew Broderick by Richard Baratz
 Heywood Broun by Alex Gard
 Ashley Brown (Mary Poppins, August 31, 2007. Signed "I'm Practically Perfect in Everyway!")
 Blair Brown
 Dara Brown
 Georgia Brown
 Jason Robert Brown (The Bridges of Madison County, May 15, 2014)
 Joe E. Brown
 Vanessa Brown by Don Bevan
 Carol Bruce by Alex Gard
 Nigel Bruce by Alex Gard
 Yul Brynner
 Jack Buchanan
 Gene Buck by Alex Gard
 Betty Buckley
 Zev Bufman
 Leo Bulgakov by Alex Gard
 Laura Bell Bundy (Legally Blonde the Musical, April 24, 2008)
 Gregg Burge
 Gary Burghoff
 Carol Burnett by Don Bevan
 George Burns by Don Bevan
 Raymond Burr by Don Bevan
 Abe Burrows
 Ellen Burstyn
 Danny Burstein
 Mike Burstyn by Richard Baratz
 Kate Burton
 Richard Burton by Richard Baratz
 Kerry Butler (Xanadu, January 15, 2008)
 Red Buttons
 Norbert Leo Butz (Dirty Rotten Scoundrels, May 5, 2005)
 David Byrne

C 
 Sid Caesar
 Zoe Caldwell
 Louis Calhern
 Frank Cambria by Alex Gard
 Bobby Cannavale
 Eddie Cantor by Alex Gard
 Virginia Capers
 Al Capp by Don Bevan
 Al Capone by Alex Gard
 Dick Capri
 MacDonald Carey
 Len Cariou
 Kitty Carlisle
 Carolee Carmello
 Primo Carnera by Alex Gard
 Art Carney (The Odd Couple)
 Carleton Carpenter
 Constance Carpenter
 Sue Carol
 Alexander Carr by Alex Gard
 Allan Carr
 Keith Carradine
 Diahann Carroll
 Renee Carroll by Alex Gard
 Johnny Carson by Don Bevan
 Dixie Carter
 Sophia Anne Caruso (Beetlejuice: The Musical, July 10, 2019)
 Brent Carver
 Peggy Cass by Don Bevan
 David Cassidy
 Jack Cassidy
 Patrick Cassidy
 Shaun Cassidy
 Reg Cathey
 Steve Cauthen
 Dick Cavett by Don Bevan
 Cedric the Entertainer
 Bennett Cerf by Don Bevan
 Michael Cerveris
 Helene Chadwick
 Kathleen Chalfant
 Richard Chamberlain
 Kevin Chamberlin
 Helen Chandler by Alex Gard
 Carol Channing
 Stockard Channing
 Schuyler Chapin
 Cyd Charisse
 Martin Charnin
 Ilka Chase by Alex Gard
 Paddy Chayefsky
 Kristin Chenoweth (You're a Good Man, Charlie Brown, Epic Proportions, January 20, 2000)
 Irving Cheskin
 Maurice Chevalier by Don Bevan
 Michael Chiklis
 Bobby Clark
 Victoria Clark (August 29, 2005)
 Fred Clark
 Petula Clark
 Jill Clayburgh
 Glenn Close by Richard Baratz
 Harold Clurman
 Irvin S. Cobb by Alex Gard
 Lee J. Cobb
 Charles Coburn
 Imogene Coca (On the Twentieth Century, April 4, 1978) by Richard Baratz
 James Coco
 David Cogan
 Alexander H. Cohen
 Jack Cohn by Alex Gard
 Julius J. Colby by Alex Gard
 Cy Coleman
 Dame Joan Collins
 Bud Collyer
 Jane Connell
 Kathy Connelly
 Harry Connick Jr.
 Kevin Conway
 Barbara Cook
 Carole Cook
 Helmar Augustus Cooper
 Bradley Cooper (The Elephant Man, May 6, 2015)
 Dulcie Cooper by Alex Gard
 Jackie Cooper
 Robert Coote
 Leanne Cope (An American in Paris, May 28, 2015)
 Joan Copeland
 Virginia Lee Corbin by Alex Gard
 Katharine Cornell by Alex Gard
 Ernest Cossart
 Pierre Cossette
 Staats Cotsworth
 Corey Cott
 Sir Noël Coward
 Daniel Craig
 Bryan Cranston (All the Way, May 29, 2014)
 Cheryl Crawford
 Joan Crawford
 Michael Crawford (as The Phantom of the Opera) by Richard Baratz
 Gavin Creel (Hair, September 30, 2009)
 Regina Crewe
 Anthony Crivello
 James Cromwell
 Walter Cronkite by Don Bevan
 Hume Cronyn
 Cathy Lee Crosby
 Sam Crothers
 Billy Crystal (700 Sundays, June 9, 2005)
 Marton Csokas
 Robert Cuccioli (Jekyll & Hyde, October 28, 1997)
 Bill Cullen by Don Bevan
 John Cullum
 Alan Cumming (Cabaret, June 8, 2014)
 Mario Cuomo
 Tim Curry

D 
 Charlotte d'Amboise (Pippin, March 11, 2014)
 Dan Dailey
 Morton DaCosta
 Jim Dale
 Tyne Daly by Richard Baratz
 Jean Dalrymple
 Lili Damita by Alex Gard
 Graciela Daniele (director-choreographer Annie Get Your Gun, May 13, 1999)
 Jason Danieley (November 5, 2010)
 Jeff Daniels
 William Daniels
 Blythe Danner
 Tony Danza
 Howard Da Silva
 Roy D'Arcy by Alex Gard
 Damon Daunno
 Michael David (Dodger Productions, October 21, 1997)
 John Davidson
 Diana Davila
 Bette Davis
 Burton Davis by Alex Gard
 Clifton Davis
 Owen Davis by Alex Gard
 Sammy Davis Jr. by Don Bevan
 Alfred DeLiagre
 Dom DeLuise by Richard Baratz
 Jack Dempsey
 Robert De Niro by Richard Baratz
 Sandy Dennis
 Eugenio Derbez
 André De Shields
 Marlene Dietrich
 Emery Deutsch by Alex Gard
 Rene Devos by Alex Gard
 Colleen Dewhurst
 Mai Dietche
 Matt Dillon
 Tom Dillon
 Alan Dinehart by Alex Gard
 Mayor David Dinkins
 Bob Dishy
 Jean Dixon by Alex Gard
 Jack Donohue by Alex Gard
 King Donovan
 Diana Douglas
 Kirk Douglas by Don Bevan
 Michael Douglas
 Tommy Douglas by Alex Gard
 Eddie Dowling
 John Doyle (The Color Purple, May 24, 2016)
 Alfred Drake by John Mackey
 Fran Drescher (Cinderella, June 3, 2014)
 Louise DuArt
 Bide Dudley by Alex Gard
 Billy Duell
 David Dukes
 Tom Dulak
 Faye Dunaway
 Mary Duncan by Alex Gard
 Sandy Duncan
 Edwin Wallace Dunn by Alex Gard
 Charles Durning by Richard Baratz (The Best Man, December 22, 2000)
 Nancy Dussault

E 
 Pearl Eaton by Alex Gard
 Fred Ebb
 Christine Ebersole (42nd Street, May 9, 2003)
 Daysi Egan
 Susan Egan (Beauty and the Beast)
 Alan Eisenberg, Executive Director of Actors' Equity, 1981–2006
 Rick Elice
 Denholm Elliott (first caricature drawn by Don Bevan)
 Patricia Elliott
 Mary Ellis by Alex Gard
 Lillian Emerson by Alex Gard
 Lehman Engel
 Leih Erickson
 Leon Errol
 Cynthia Erivo (The Color Purple, June 12, 2016)
 Melissa Errico
 Chester Erskine by Alex Gard
 Dame Edith Evans
 Maurice Evans
 Judith Evelyn
 Rupert Everett
 Tom Ewell
 Marjorie Eyre by Alex Gard
 William Eythe
 Raúl Esparza (Company, May 22, 2007)

F 
 Mallory Factor
 Douglas Fairbanks by Alex Gard
 Douglas Fairbanks Jr. by Alex Gard
 Robert Fairchild (An American in Paris, May 28, 2015)
 Edie Falco
 Jamie Farr
 Mia Farrow by Richard Baratz
 Rick Faugro
 Farrah Fawcett
 Frank Fay by Alex Gard
 Mary Fay
 Peggy Fears by Alex Gard
 Seymour Felix by Alex Gard
 Jesse Tyler Ferguson (Fully Committed, May 19, 2016)
 José Ferrer
 Betty Field by Alex Gard
 Sally Field
 Sylvia Field by Alex Gard
 Harvey Fierstein
 Albert Finney by Don Bevan
 Laurence Fishburne
 Geraldine Fitzgerald
 Robert Flemyng
 Nina Foch
 Martin Flavin by Alex Gard
 Henry Fonda
 Jane Fonda
 Santino Fontana
 Paul Ford
 John Forsythe by Don Bevan
 Bob Fosse by Richard Baratz
 Norman Foster by Alex Gard
 Sutton Foster by Richard Baratz
 Beth Fowler
 Sergio Franchi
 Arlene Francis by Don Bevan
 James Franco (Of Mice and Men, May 21, 2014)
 Richard Frankel (producer Frankel-Baruch-Viertel-Routh Group, June 2004)
 Samuel Freedman
 Jonathan Freeman (42nd Street, April 5, 2002)
 Kathleen Freeman
 Morgan Freeman
 Jim Freydberg
 Robert Fryer
 David Frost by Don Bevan
 Penny Fuller

G 
 Martin Gabel
 James Gandolfini
 Vincent Gardenia by Richard Baratz
 Reginald Gardiner by Alex Gard
 Andrew Garfield
 Robert Garland by Alex Gard
 Betty Garrett by Alex Gard
 David Garrison (Titanic, 1997)
 Lillian Gatlin by Alex Gard
 Bob Gaudio
 Janet Gaynor
 Arthur Gelb
 George Gershwin by Alex Gard
 Tamara Geva by Alex Gard
 Sir John Gielgud
 Kathie Lee Gifford
 Jack Gilford
 Hermione Gingold
 Jackie Gleason by Don Bevan
 Joanna Gleason (Dirty Rotten Scoundrels, May 5, 2005)
 Lucille Gleason by Alex Gard
 Robert Gleckler by Alex Gard
 Montego Glover (Memphis, March 10, 2011)
 Whoopi Goldberg by Richard Baratz (November 13, 1984)
 Annie Golden (The Full Monty, 2002)
 Edwin Franko Goldman by Alex Gard
 George Goldsmith by Alex Gard
 Cuba Gooding Jr. (The Trip to Bountiful, August 22, 2013)
 John Goodman
 Jack Gould by Don Bevan
 Robert Goulet by Richard Baratz
 Gilda Gray by Alex Gard
 Lauren Graham
 Jeanne Green by Alex Gard
 Johnny Green by Alex Gard
 Claude P. Greneker by Alex Gard
 Joel Grey by Don Bevan
 Harry Wagstaff Gribble by Alex Gard
 David Alan Grier (RACE, 2010)
 Merv Griffin by Don Bevan
 D.W. Griffith by Alex Gard
 Rachel Griffiths
 Josh Groban
 Milt Gross by Alex Gard
 George Grossmith, Jr. by Alex Gard
 Texas Guinan by Alex Gard
 Sir Alec Guinness
 Arthur Guiterman by Alex Gard
 Gerald Gutierrez (director, April 16, 1998)
 Edmund Gwenn
 Fred Gwynne by Richard Baratz

H 
 Dorothy Hall by Alex Gard
 Mordaunt Hall (film critic for The New York Times) by Alex Gard
 Mark Hamill
 George Hamilton by Richard Baratz
 Margaret Hamilton
 Marvin Hamlisch by Richard Baratz (December 29, 1976)
 Oscar Hammerstein II
 Tom Hanks (Lucky Guy, May 23, 2013)
 Otto Harbach by Alex Gard
 Kenneth Harlan by Alex Gard
 Sheldon Harnick
 Valerie Harper
 William Harrigan by Alex Gard
 Jed Harris by Alex Gard
 Julie Harris by Don Bevan
 Neil Patrick Harris (Hedwig and the Angry Inch, August 15, 2014)
 Phil Harris by Alex Gard
 Richard Harris by Richard Baratz
 Sam H. Harris by Alex Gard
 Sir Rex Harrison
 Kitty Carlisle Hart by Don Bevan
 Lorenz Hart by Alex Gard
 Vivian Hart by Alex Gard
 Paul Hartman by Alex Gard
 William Hawkins by Don Bevan
 Helen Hayes by Alex Gard
 Betty Healy by Alex Gard
 Ted Healy (1927, subject of the first Sardi's caricature) by Alex Gard
 Van Heflin by Don Bevan
 Mark Hellinger by Alex Gard
 Florence Henderson
 Shuler Hensley (Oklahoma!, July 9, 2002)
 Katharine Hepburn by Alex Gard
 Evelyn Herbert by Alex Gard
 F. Hugh Herbert by Don Bevan
 Ed Herlihy
 Jerry Herman
 Harry Hershfield by Alex Gard
 Charlton Heston
 John Benjamin Hickey
 Tom Hiddleston (Betrayal, 2019)
 Arthur Hill
 Dame Wendy Hiller by Alex Gard
 Gregory Hines by Richard Baratz
 Maurice Hines
 Paul Hipp
 Al Hirschfeld
 Dustin Hoffman by Richard Baratz
 Gertrude W. Hoffman by Alex Gard
 Llora Hoffman by Alex Gard
 Hal Holbrook by Don Bevan
 William Holden
 Stanley Holloway
 Celeste Holm
 Bob Hope
 Sir Anthony Hopkins
 Miriam Hopkins by Alex Gard
 Lena Horne
 Jayne Houdyshell (The Humans, June 2, 2016)
 John Houseman by Richard Baratz
 Leslie Howard by Alex Gard
 Terrence Howard
 Julia Hoyt by Alex Gard
 Josephine Hull by Alex Gard
 Cecil Humphreys by Alex Gard
 Fannie Hurst by Alex Gard
 Muriel Hutchison by Alex Gard
 Wilfred Hyde-White by Don Bevan
 Jeff Hyslop
 Sir Nicholas Hytner

I 
 Amy Irving
 George S. Irving 
 Dana Ivey
 Judith Ivey
 Bill Irwin
 Burl Ives

J 
 Hugh Jackman
 Cheyenne Jackson (Xanadu, January 15, 2008)
 Samuel L. Jackson
 Christopher Jackson (Hamilton, November 11, 2016)
 Lou Jacobi
 Bernard Jacobs by Richard Baratz
 Brian d'Arcy James
 Leon Janney by Alex Gard
 Gregory Jbara (Dirty Rotten Scoundrels, May 5, 2005)
 Martin Jensen by Alex Gard
 George Jessel by Alex Gard
 Billy Joel by Richard Baratz
 Glynis Johns
 Edward Johnson by Alex Gard
 Van Johnson
 Al Jolson by Alex Gard
 James Earl Jones by Don Bevan
 Rachel Bay Jones (Pippin, March 11, 2014)
 Ray Jones by Alex Gard
 Rebecca Naomi Jones
 Shirley Jones (42nd Street, July 2004)
 Raul Julia

K 
 John Kander
 Helen Kane by Alex Gard
 Andy Karl (Groundhog Day, June 1, 2017)
 Sonia Karlov by Alex Gard
 George S. Kaufman by Alex Gard
 Judy Kaye
 Stacy Keach
 Ian Keith by Alex Gard
 Colin Keith-Johnston by Alex Gard
 Helen Keller by Alex Gard
 Gene Kelly
 Grace Kelly by Don Bevan
 Nell Kelly by Alex Gard
 Pert Kelton by Don Bevan (Signed, "Only someone who's been around as long as I have can appreciate this")
 Nick Kenny by Alex Gard
 Kermit the Frog (leftover prop from The Muppets Take Manhattan, located near restrooms) by anonymous
 Jerome Kern
 Walter Kerr by Don Bevan
 Richard Kiley
 Dorothy Kilgallen by Alex Gard
 Chad Kimball (Memphis, March 10, 2011)
 John Reed King
 Walter J. Kingsley by Alex Gard
 Muriel Kirkland by Alex Gard
 Eartha Kitt by Don Bevan
 Robert Klein by Richard Baratz
 Werner Klemperer by Richard Baratz
 Jack Klugman by Richard Baratz
 Mayor Ed Koch by Richard Baratz
 Ernie Kovacs by Don Bevan
 Jane Krakowski (She Loves Me, May 31, 2016)
 Judy Kuhn (Fun Home, June 2, 2015)
 Frederic Arnold Kummer by Alex Gard
 Swoosie Kurtz by Richard Baratz

L 
 Cheryl Ladd (Annie Get Your Gun, January 10, 2001)
 Harriette Lake (a.k.a. Ann Sothern) by Alex Gard
 Rocco Landesman
 Nathan Lane
 Dame Angela Lansbury by Don Bevan
 Laura La Plante by Alex Gard
 Ring Lardner by Alex Gard
 Bert Lahr by Alex Gard
 Fritz Lang
 Dick Latessa (Hairspray, around May 23, 2003)
 Cyndi Lauper (June 5, 2013)
 Dan Lauria
 Linda Lavin
 Gertrude Lawrence by Alex Gard
 Lawrence Shubert Lawrence by Don Bevan
 Thomas F. Leahy 
 Beth Leavel
 Guy LeBow
 Gavin Lee (Mary Poppins, August 31, 2007)
 Michele Lee (December 14, 2006)
 John Leguizamo
 Charles LeMaire by Alex Gard
 Jack Lemmon by Don Bevan
 Edna Leedom by Alex Gard
 Alexander Leftwich by Alex Gard
 Margaret Leighton
 Lotte Lenya
 Mervyn LeRoy by Alex Gard
 Telly Leung
 Jerry Lewis
 Michael Shawn Lewis (The Phantom of the Opera, September 25, 2002)
 Norm Lewis (The Gershwins' Porgy and Bess, June 1, 2012)
 Beatrice Lillie
 Max Lief by Alex Gard
 Judith Light
 Hal Linden by Donald Bevan
 Hal Linden by Richard Baratz
 Mayor John Lindsay 
 Laura Linney
 Joe Lisi
 John Lithgow
 Lucy Liu
 Tony LoBianco
 June Lockhart
 Joshua Logan
 Anita Loos by Alex Gard
 Robert Loraine by Alex Gard
 Peter Lorre by Alex Gard
 Priscilla Lopez
 Bessie Love by Alex Gard
 Myrna Loy by Richard Baratz
 Ernst Lubitsch by Alex Gard
 Josh Lucas
 Susan Lucci (Annie Get Your Gun, April 8, 2000)
 Patti LuPone
 Wanda Lyon by Alex Gard
 Bert Lytell by Alex Gard

M 
 Lebo M.
 Joseph Macaulay by Alex Gard
 Shirley MacLaine by Don Bevan
 Jeanette MacDonald by Alex Gard
 Bruce MacFarlane by Alex Gard
 Dorothy Mackaill by Alex Gard
 Kenneth MacKenna by Alex Gard
 Sir Cameron Mackintosh
 Will Mahoney by Alex Gard
 Karl Malden by Don Bevan
 John Malkovich by Richard Baratz
 Louis Mann by Alex Gard
 Terrence Mann
 Barry Manilow (February 14, 2013)
 Joe Mantello
 Arthur Margetson by John Mackey
 Constantine Maroulis (Rock of Ages, March 18, 2010)
 Marian Marsh by Alex Gard
 Everett Marshall by Alex Gard
 Rob Marshall
 Andrea Martin (Pippin, August 29, 2013)
 Bob Martin (The Drowsy Chaperone, December 27, 2006)
 The Marx Brothers by Alex Gard
 Raymond Massey
 Marlee Matlin (Spring Awakening, November 24, 2015)
 Walter Matthau by Don Bevan
 Michael Mayer
 Jefferson Mays (A Gentleman's Guide to Love and Murder, October 29, 2014)
 Marin Mazzie (Kiss Me, Kate, May 4, 2000)
 Andrea McArdle (Beauty and the Beast, January 26, 2000)
 Jack McCauley by Alex Gard
 John McClain by Don Bevan
 Rue McClanahan
 Guthrie McClintic
 Rob McClure (Chaplin, November 14, 2012)
 Mildred McCoy by Alex Gard
 Audra McDonald (Ragtime, December 17, 1998)
 Frances McDormand
 Reba McEntire
 Maureen McGovern
 Michael McGrath
 Jimmy McHugh by Alex Gard
 Sir Ian McKellen by Richard Baratz
 Harry McNaughton by Alex Gard
 Janet McTeer
 Lynne Meadow (October 24, 2012)
 Audrey Meadows by Don Bevan
 Jayne Meadows by Don Bevan
 Anne Meara by Richard Baratz
 John Henry Mears by Alex Gard
 Leighton Meester (Of Mice and Men, May 21, 2014)
 Lindsay Mendez
 Alan Menken by Richard Baratz
 Burgess Meredith
 Philip Merivale by Alex Gard
 Ethel Merman by Alex Gard
 David Merrick
 Bette Midler
 Ann Miller (Sugar Babies, 1979)
 Arthur Miller
 Ernst Miller by Alex Gard
 Marilyn Miller by Alex Gard
 Mitch Miller by Don Bevan
 Patina Miller (Pippin, March 11, 2014)
 Patsy Ruth Miller by Alex Gard
 Sienna Miller (Cabaret, March 27, 2015)
 Sir John Mills
 Liza Minnelli by Richard Baratz
 Lin-Manuel Miranda (Hamilton, May 24, 2016)
 Dame Helen Mirren (The Audience, May 12, 2015)
 Jerry Mitchell (Kinky Boots, December 11, 2013)
 Thomas Mitchell by Alex Gard
 Alfred Molina (Fiddler on the Roof, August 4, 2004)
 Ricardo Montalbán by Don Bevan
 Mary Tyler Moore by Richard Baratz
 Michael Moore 
 Victor Moore by Alex Gard
 Ward Morehouse by Alex Gard
 Claudia Morgan by Alex Gard
 Frank Morgan by Alex Gard
 Helen Morgan by Alex Gard
 Robert Morley
 Dave E. Morris by Alex Gard
 Robert Morse by Don Bevan
 Charles B. Moskowitz by Alex Gard
 Elisabeth Moss (The Heidi Chronicles, May 28, 2015)
 Zero Mostel by Don Bevan
 Alan Mowbray by Alex Gard
 Jessie Mueller (Beautiful: The Carole King Musical, January 23, 2015)
 Paul Muni by Alex Gard
 Ona Munson by Alex Gard
 Arthur Murray by Don Bevan
 Kathryn Murray by Don Bevan

N 
 Mark Nadler
 Rick Najera
 Kathy Najimy by Richard Baratz
 N. Nakarovo
 Joe Namath
 Mildred Natwick by Richard Baratz
 James Naughton
 Patricia Neal
 James M. Nederlander
 Robert Nederlander
 Gene Nelson
 Bebe Neuwirth
 Paul Newman by Don Bevan
 Phyllis Newman
 Kristine Nielsen (Vanya and Sonia and Masha and Spike, August 21, 2013)
 Greta Nissen by Alex Gard
 Cynthia Nixon
 Lloyd Nolan
 Alan North
 Jim Norton (Of Mice and Men, May 21, 2014)
 Chris Noth by Richard Baratz (The Best Man, December 22, 2000)
 Michael Nouri
 Nelle Nugent
 Lupita Nyong'o (Eclipsed, May 19, 2016)

O 
 Jack Oakie
 Pat O'Brien
 Carroll O'Connor by Richard Baratz
 Nell O'Day by Alex Gard
 Rosie O'Donnell (November 11, 2008)
 Chris O'Dowd (Of Mice and Men, May 21, 2014)
 Kelli O'Hara (Nice Work If You Can Get It, June 5, 2012)
 Eugene O'Neill by Alex Gard
 Maureen O'Sullivan
 The Lord Olivier by Don Bevan
 Jerry Orbach
 Orfeh
 Sono Osato by Alex Gard
 E. W. Osborn by Alex Gard
 Brad Oscar (The Producers, March 13, 2002)
 Donny Osmond (Beauty and the Beast, October 27, 2006)
 Marie Osmond (October 27, 2006)
 Haley Joel Osmont
 Laura Osnes (Bandstand, May 12, 2017)
 Catherine Dale Owen by Alex Gard

P 
 Jack Paar by Don Bevan
 Al Pacino by Richard Baratz
 Patrick Page
 Chazz Palminteri
 Joseph Papp by Richard Baratz
 Dorothy Parker
 Mandy Patinkin
 Ed Paul by Alex Gard
 J. Lennox Pawle by Alex Gard
 Brock Pemberton by Alex Gard
 Virginia Pemberton by Alex Gard
 Rosie Perez
 Anthony Perkins by Don Bevan
 Bobbie Perkins by Alex Gard
 Bernadette Peters
 Boris Petroff by Alex Gard
 Regis Philbin by Richard Baratz
 Lou Diamond Phillips
 Margaret Phillips by Alex Gard
 Sally Phipps by Alex Gard
 Molly Picon by Alex Gard
 David Hyde Pierce (Spamalot, May 17, 2005)
 Bryce Pinkham (A Gentleman's Guide to Love and Murder, October 29, 2014)
 Luigi Pirandello by Alex Gard
 Louise Pitre (Mamma Mia!, February 2002) Pitre has a drink in hand
 Ben Platt
 Oliver Platt
 Donald Pleasence
 Dame Joan Plowright by Don Bevan
 Christopher Plummer by Don Bevan
 Sidney Poitier by Don Bevan
 Arthur Pollock by Alex Gard
 Lily Pons by Alex Gard
 Billy Porter (Kinky Boots, December 11, 2013)
 Tom Poston
 Jane Powell
 Robert Preston by Don Bevan
 Georgie Price by Alex Gard
 Vincent Price
 Sir Jonathan Pryce by Richard Baratz
 Gertrude Purcell by Alex Gard

Q 
 Sir Anthony Quayle
 Anthony Quinn by Don Bevan

R 
 Daniel Radcliffe (Equus, January 29, 2009)
 Charlotte Rae by Richard Baratz
 Rafiki (The Lion King)
 Natacha Rambova by Alex Gard
 Sara Ramirez
 Tony Randall by Don Bevan
 Joyce Randolph by Richard Baratz
 Phylicia Rashad
 Herbert Rawlinson by Alex Gard
 Charles Ray by Alex Gard
 Janet Reade by Alex Gard
 Lynn Redgrave
 Sir Michael Redgrave
 Carl Reiner
 Ann Reinking (Chicago and Fosse, March 20, 1999)
 Charles Nelson Reilly by Richard Baratz
 Lee Remick by Don Bevan
 William Ricciardi by Alex Gard
 Cathy Rigby (Peter Pan, August 26, 1999)
 Alice Ripley (Next to Normal, September 24, 2009)
 Cyril Ritchard
 John Ritter
 Chita Rivera by Don Bevan
 Joan Rivers by Richard Baratz
 Jason Robards by Don Bevan
 Jerome Robbins
 Chris Rock
 Richard Rodgers
 Elizabeth Rodriguez
 Ginger Rogers
 Ruth Roland by Alex Gard
 Anika Noni Rose
 Rose Marie (October 3, 2017, Signed "I'm very honored!! Thank you so much. Lots of love, Rose Marie.")
 A.M. Rosenthal by Richard Baratz
 Harry Rosenthal by Alex Gard
 Lillian Roth by Alex Gard
 Marc Routh (producer Frankel-Baruch-Viertel-Routh Group, June 2004)
 Richard Roxburgh ("The Present" March 14, 2017)
 Elvina Rowe by Alex Gard
 Arthur Rubin (actor & singer; later Vice President/General Manager of the Nederlander Organization)
 John Rubinstein (Pippin, July 31, 2014)
 Paul Rudd (Grace, October 9, 2012)
 Rosalind Russell
 Robert Ryan by Don Bevan
 Louis Rydell by Alex Gard

S 
 Donald Saddler (May 25, 2007)
 Bob Saget
 Lea Salonga
 Diana Sands
 Stark Sands (Kinky Boots, December 11, 2013)
 Cristina Saralegui
 Marie Saxon by Alex Gard
 Tito Schipa by Alex Gard
 Gerald Schoenfeld by Richard Baratz
 Louis Schonceit by Alex Gard
 Annabella Sciorra
 Thomas Schumacher (Mary Poppins producer. Signed "Holly Cow, Who the hell is that?!? ~". He meant to write "Holy Cow~".)
 Paul Scofield
 George C. Scott by Richard Baratz
 Sherie Rene Scott (Dirty Rotten Scoundrels, May 5, 2005)
 Oscar Serlin by Alex Gard
 Jane Seymour (Amadeus, April 23, 1981)
 Michael Shannon (Grace, October 9, 2012)
 William Shatner
 Julia Shawell by Alex Gard
 Michael Sheen (Frost/Nixon, August 10, 2007)
 Tony Sheldon
 Carole Shelley
 Brooke Shields
 Samuel Shipman by Alex Gard
 Martin Short
 Lee Shubert
 Sylvia Sidney
 Christopher Sieber (Matilda the Musical, November 13, 2014)
 Beverly Sills
 Douglas Sills (The Scarlet Pimpernel, June 4, 1998)
 Phil Silvers
 Neil Simon (Don Bevan)
 Hugh Sinclair by Alex Gard
 Gary Sinise
 Menasha Skulnik
 Christian Slater
 John Slattery
 Liz Smith by Richard Baratz
 Dame Maggie Smith
 Rex Smith (The Scarlet Pimpernel, January 20, 1999)
 Stanley Smith by Alex Gard
 Louis Sobol
 Suzanne Somers
 Stephen Sondheim
 Phillipa Soo (February 28, 2018)
 Paul Sorvino by Richard Baratz
 James Spader (RACE, 2010)
 John Stamos
 Dave Stamper by Alex Gard
 Kim Stanley
 Barbara Stanwyck
 Jean Stapleton
 Maureen Stapleton by Don Bevan
 John Steinbeck
 Sir Patrick Stewart
 Dorothy Stickney
 Jerry Stiller by Richard Baratz
 Sting (The Last Ship, January 20, 2015)
 Lee Strasberg
 Barbra Streisand (June 13, 2016)
 Elaine Stritch
 Ed Strong (Dodger Productions, October 21, 1997)
 Charles Strouse
 Sally Struthers
 Susan Stroman
 Barry Sullivan
 Ed Sullivan by Don Bevan
 Gloria Swanson
 Will Swenson
 Kay Swift (1987, to honor her 90th birthday)
 Loretta Swit

T 
 Billy Taylor
 Desiree Tabor by Alex Gard
 Elizabeth Taylor by Richard Baratz
 Renee Taylor
 Jessica Tandy
 Estelle Taylor by Alex Gard
 Laurette Taylor
 Ruth Taylor by Alex Gard
 Mary Testa (42nd Street, March 1, 2002)
 Danny Thomas
 Marlo Thomas
 Matthew James Thomas (Pippin, March 11, 2014)
 Richard Thomas
 Jennifer Laura Thompson
 Uma Thurman
 Howard Thurston by Alex Gard
 Gene Tierney
 Bill Todman
 Toto the Clown by Alex Gard
 Lily Tomlin by Richard Baratz
 Topol
 Tamara Toumanova by Alex Gard
 Constance Tours
 John Travolta
 Lady Viola Tree
 Paula Trueman by Alex Gard
 Ernest Truex by Alex Gard
 Stanley Tucci
 Sophie Tucker
 Tommy Tune
 Aaron Tveit (Moulin Rouge! (musical), March 31, 2022)
 Twiggy (a.k.a. Dame Lesley Lawson)
 Margaret Tyzack

U 
 Leslie Uggams
 Leslie Uggams
 Alfred Uhry
 Nick Ullett
 Tracey Ullman
 Liv Ullmann
 Harriette Underhill by Alex Gard
 Blair Underwood
 Sir Peter Ustinov

V 
 Brenda Vaccaro
 Rudy Vallee by Alex Gard
 Bobby Van
 Joop van den Ende (producer, November 26, 2000) by Richard Baratz
 Dick Van Dyke by Don Bevan
 Jo Van Fleet
 Benay Venuta
 Tom Van Dycke by Alex Gard
 Courtney B. Vance (Lucky Guy, July 3, 2013)
 Yul Vazquez
 Gwen Verdon by Don Bevan
 Gerry Vichi
 Gore Vidal (writer The Best Man, September 29, 2000)
 Bayard Veiller by Alex Gard
 Ben Vereen by Don Bevan
 Tom Viertel (producer Frankel-Baruch-Viertel-Routh Group, June 2004)
 Ana Villafane
 Jon Voight

W 
 Mayor Robert Wagner
 Christopher Walken
 Jessica Walker
 Mayor Jimmy Walker by Alex Gard
 Nancy Walker
 Polly Walker by Alex Gard
 David Wallace
 Mike Wallace by Don Bevan
 Eli Wallach
 Ray Walston
 Tony Walton
 Robert Wankel
 Sherman Warner (Dodger Productions, October 21, 1997)
 Fred Waring by Alex Gard
 Ruth Warrick
 Kerry Washington (RACE, 2010)
 Sam Waterston
 Linda Watkins by Alex Gard
 Douglas Watt
 Richard Watts, Jr. by Alex Gard
 David Wayne
 Paula Wayne by Don Bevan
 Fritz Weaver
 Steven Weber
 Robert Webber
 Robert Weede
 Irving Welzer (producer Annie Get Your Gun, August 4, 1999)
 Rita Weiman by Alex Gard
 Raquel Welch
 Dr. Ruth Westheimer
 Jack Weston by Richard Baratz
 George White
 Lillias White
 Robert Whitehead
 Mary Wickes
 Crane Wilbur by Alex Gard
 Frank Wildhorn (composer The Scarlet Pimpernel, June 4, 1999)
 Lee Wilkof
 Elizabeth Williams
 Herb Williams (–1936) by Alex Gard
 John Williams
 Michelle Williams
 Treat Williams
 Vanessa Williams
 Bruce Willis
 Earl Wilson 
 Elizabeth Wilson
 John C. Wilson
 Meredith Willson
 Rita Wilson
 Paul Winchell by Don Bevan
 Walter Winchell
 Claire Windsor
 Henry Winkler (The Dinner Party, November 30, 2000)
 Roland Winters
 Shelley Winters by Don Bevan
 Estelle Winwood
 Iggie Wolfington
 John Wood
 Joanne Woodward
 Alexander Woollcott by Alex Gard
 Walter Woolf by Alex Gard
 Tom Wopat (Annie Get Your Gun, June 30, 1999)
 JoAnne Worley
 Teresa Wright
 Gretchen Wyler
 Ed Wynn
 Keenan Wynn

Y 
 Tony Yazbeck (On The Town, August 4, 2015)
 Lewis Yancey by Alex Gard
 Maury Yeston
 Michael York
 Rachel York
 Gig Young
 John Lloyd Young (Jersey Boys, February 23, 2006)
 Tammany Young by Alex Gard
 Blanche Yurka by Alex Gard

Z 
 Pia Zadora
 Billy Zane
 Florenz Ziegfeld
 Karen Ziemba
 Katharine Zimmermann
 Fred Zollo

Double portraits 
 Marge and Gower Champion by Don Bevan
 Betty Comden and Adolph Green by Don Bevan
 Dame Edna and Barry Humphries (Dame Edna: The Royal Tour, February 20, 2000)
 Earle Larrimore and Selena Royle by Alex Gard
 Alan Jay Lerner and Frederick Loewe by Don Bevan
 Colette Brosset and Robert Dhery
 Howard Lindsay and Russel Crouse by Alex Gard
 Alfred Lunt and Lynn Fontanne by Alex Gard
 Willie and Eugene Howard by Alex Gard
 Fredric March and Florence Eldridge by Don Bevan
 Ken Waissman and Maxine Fox
 Cy Feuer and Ernst Martin
 Peter and Mary Lind Hayes
 Edgar Lansbury and Joseph Beruh
 Juliet and Lester Lewis
 Barry and Fran Weissler
 Mike Nichols and Elaine May by Don Bevan
 Penn & Teller (Penn & Teller On Broadway, July 1, 2015)
 Harold Prince and Bobby Griffith by Don Bevan
 Richard Rodgers and Oscar Hammerstein II by Alex Gard
 Jerome Lawrence and Robert E. Lee
 Paul Winchell with ventriloquist figure Jerry Mahoney by Don Bevan

Quadruple portraits 
 Dudley Moore, Jonathan Miller, Alan Bennett, and Peter Cook of Beyond the Fringe by Don Bevan
 Oona Lawrence, Bailey Ryon, Sophia Gennusa, and Milly Shapiro all playing "Matilda" in Matilda the Musical

See also 
 List of caricaturists

References 
Notes

Citations

Sources
 Vincent Sardi, Jr. with Thomas Edward West. Off the Wall at Sardi's (Applause Books, 1991) 
 Various Playbill articles, 1999–2008
 Sardi's (Restaurant) caricatures, 1913–1976, held by the Billy Rose Theatre Division, New York Public Library for the Performing Arts.

Broadway theatre
Culture of New York City
Caricature
Sardi's
Lists of cartoons